The Middleburgh School District is a public school district located in Middleburgh, New York, U.S. It is one of the largest school districts in New York by land area. The district educates about 1,000 students in three schools.

Founding
Middleburgh's school district was serviced originally by a one-room school house. Where the current high school is situated was another school which existed until the current building was erected early in the twentieth century.

Current
The Superintendent is Brian Dunn. The elementary school principal is Amy Irwin. The chief counselor for the Home Run Program in the elementary school is Penny Avitabile. The high school principal is Matthew Sloane.

School Board
The Middleburgh School Board meets in the school's library. In the 2008 School Board election, challenger Araxi Dutton Palmer was defeated by Kim Smith by a 405-329 margin. Members of the current board include Frank Herodes. The last previous president of the Board was Michael Richmond.

References

External links
 

School districts in New York (state)
Education in Schoharie County, New York